Ophioceratidae is an extinct family of cephalopods belonging to the Ammonite order Ceratitida and superfamily Noritoidea.

References 

 The Paleobiology Database accessed 9/24/07

Noritoidea
Ceratitida families